Harmen J. Bussemaker (born 1968, Hengelo) is a Dutch and American biological physicist, professor at Columbia University, and Principal Investigator of the Harmen Bussemaker lab.

Awards
2010 Guggenheim Fellows

References

External links
"Harmen J. Bussemaker", Scientific Commons
"What's special about the GpU dinucleotide platform?", Xiang-Jun's Corner, April 2, 2010

1968 births
Living people
21st-century American physicists
21st-century Dutch physicists
Columbia University faculty
Utrecht University alumni